The Granada Theater, located on 2nd and Washington streets in The Dalles, Oregon, United States, was built in 1929. The exterior of theater is in the Moorish Revival style.

This theater is said to have been the first theater west of the Mississippi to show a "talkie".

A plaque bearing the seal of the State of Oregon on the side of the building reads, "Granada Theater: This Moorish-style motion picture theater was completed in 1930 for its first proprietor, M.R. Matthew, at a cost of $125,000. The plans were prepared by William Cutts of Portland, who designed approximately sixty theaters for the Universal Film Corporation. Planned at the height of the silent screen era, the theater nonetheless was equipped with Vitaphone and Movietone sound systems. The facade of the concrete building was detailed to imitate Moorish Architecture. Its stucco finish was accented with brick and tile, and its domed towers, arcaded parapet, and horseshoe-arched windows framed by twisted spiral columns were designed to create the exotic atmosphere of the Mediterranean."

The City of The Dalles purchased the theater in September 2010. The building is in The Dalles Commercial Historic District.

References

External links 
 Granada Theater (official website)

Cinemas and movie theaters in Oregon
Buildings and structures in The Dalles, Oregon
1929 establishments in Oregon
Historic district contributing properties in Oregon
National Register of Historic Places in Wasco County, Oregon
Theatres on the National Register of Historic Places in Oregon